Amanda Smith ( Berry; January 23, 1837 – February 24, 1915) was a Methodist preacher and former slave who funded The Amanda Smith Orphanage and Industrial Home for Abandoned and Destitute Colored Children outside Chicago. She was a leader in the Wesleyan-Holiness movement, preaching the doctrine of entire sanctification throughout Methodist camp meetings across the world.

Early life
Smith was born to enslaved parents in Long Green, Maryland, a small town in Baltimore County. Her father was Samuel Berry and her mother was Mariam Matthews. She was the oldest of thirteen siblings. Her father was a well-trusted man, and his master's widow trusted him enough to place him in charge of her farm. After his duties for the day were done, Mr. Berry was allowed to go out and earn extra money for himself and his family. Many nights he would go without sleeping because he was busy making brooms and husk mats for the Baltimore market to make extra cash. He was devoted to the goal of freedom. After first purchasing his freedom, he made it his mission to buy that of his family. After his family's freedom was secured, they settled in Pennsylvania.

Childhood 
Growing up, Smith had the advantage of learning to read and write. “Her father made it a regular practice on Sunday mornings to read to his family from the Bible. Her mother helped her to learn reading before she was eight and was sent to school.”  Unlike many other enslaved children and adults, Smith had the privilege of learning at an early age. She and her younger brother attended school at the age of eight. The school only held summer sessions and after six weeks of attending, the school was forced to close. Five years later, at the age of 13, they had been given another option of attending school. However, the school was five miles from their home and they would only be taught if there was time after the teachers gave the white kids their lesson. The Smith siblings felt that it was not worth traveling in the cold to receive lessons only if time was permitted. After two weeks of attending school, they dropped out and were taught at home by their parents and sometimes taught themselves.  

With only having three and a half months of formal schooling, Amanda went to work near York, Pennsylvania, as the servant of a widow with five children. While there, she attended a revival service at the Methodist Episcopal Church.

Adult life
Smith worked as a cook and a washerwoman to provide for herself and her daughter after her husband was killed in the American Civil War. By the time Smith was thirty-two, she had lost two husbands and four of her five children. Attending religious camp meetings and revivals helped Smith work through her grief and avoid depression. She immersed herself in the African Methodist Episcopal (AME) Church and met with Phoebe Palmer, a Methodist preacher who led the Wesleyan-Holiness movement. In 1868, Amanda Smith testified that she had experienced entire sanctification.

In 1867, the National Camp Meeting Association for the Promotion of Holiness was organized and Smith began preaching the doctrine of entire sanctification at camp meetings. Prayer became a way of life for her as she trusted God for shoes, the money to buy her sister's freedom, and food for her family. She became well known for her beautiful voice and inspired teaching and hence, opportunities to evangelize in the South and West opened up for her. African-American women in the nineteenth century took the way they dressed very seriously and so did others. Being a preacher and traveling as much as Amanda did, she thought out her dress carefully. Wherever she went, she wore a plain poke bonnet and a brown or black Quaker wrapper, and she carried her own carpetbag suitcase. The appearances of women in the nineteenth century have been described as "[Especially] fraught with volatile meanings, as the line between seemingly overly sexual or appearing presumptuously dressed above one's station was a fine one." African-American women struggled with receiving the respect they deserved even if they dressed the part of a lady. This was due to "Shadowed stereotypes bred in slavery of wanton Jezebels and pious Mammies". If free, African-American women dressed out of their respective class, judgments would be made against them.

In 1878, Smith arranged for her daughter, Mazie, to study in England. The two traveled overseas and stayed in England for two years. On the journey over, the captain invited her to conduct a religious service on board and she was so modest that the other passengers spread word of her. She next traveled to and ministered in India, where she stayed for eighteen months. Smith then spent eight years in Africa, working with churches and evangelizing. She traveled to Liberia and West Africa. Smith also expanded her family by adopting two African boys. 

While in Africa she suffered from repeated attacks of "African Fever" but persisted in her work. As a strong proponent of the Temperance Movement both in Africa and in the United States, she was invited by noted temperance advocate Rev. Dr. Theodore Ledyard Cuyler to preach at his Lafayette Avenue Presbyterian Church in Brooklyn, New York, then the largest church in its denomination, on her return to America. Methodist minister Phineas Bresee invited Amanda Smith to lead services of worship at Asbury Methodist Episcopal Church in May 1891.

Smith fund raised for the Amanda Smith Orphanage and Industrial Home for Abandoned and Destitute Colored Children. It was an institution for the poor and friendless colored children. Located in Harvey, a suburban community south of Chicago, the orphanage opened on June 28, 1899. The institution provided a home for children to become self-reliant. Funds were sent by the Ladies Negro's Friend Society in Birmingham, U.K.  

She was dedicated and put forth a lot of energy for the home. However, she soon met conflict with the orphanage due to many problems such as financial, a fire that destroyed the building, conflict between Smith and the staff, complaints from neighbors, and failed inspections by the orphan home investigators. Two years following Smith's death, another fire broke out in the home killing two girls. The building was closed for good.

Later life and death 
Her autobiography was published in 1893, titled An Autobiography, The Story of the Lord's Dealing with Mrs. Amanda Smith, the Colored Evangelist Containing an Account of her Life Work of Faith, and Her Travels in America, England, Ireland, Scotland, India, and Africa, as An Independent Missionary.

She died in 1915 at the age of 78.

See also 

 African Methodist Episcopal Church
 Mary G. Evans
 Jarena Lee
 Martha Jayne Keys

References

Further reading
Israel, Adrienne. 1998. Amanda Berry Smith: from washerwoman to evangelist. Lanham, MD: Scarecrow Press.
Walls, Ingrid Reneau. 2020. The enchanted life of Amanda Berry Smith (1837-1915): A Nineteenth Century Africa-American World Christian. Journal of African Christian Thought 23.1:14-19.

External links
An Autobiography: The Story of the Lord's Dealings with Mrs. Amanda Smith, the Colored Evangelist: Containing an Account of Her Life Work of Faith, and Her Travels in America, England, Ireland, Scotland, India, and Africa as an Independent Missionary. Chicago: Meyer & Brother Publishers, 1893. (Google Books)
autobiography: NYPL online text 

1837 births
1915 deaths
People from Baltimore County, Maryland
19th-century American slaves
American temperance activists
Methodists from Maryland
American former slaves
Founders of orphanages
 19th-century African-American women
African-American missionaries